Steinar Ege (born 10 April 1972) is a retired Norwegian handballer. He last played for Handball-Bundesliga side THW Kiel. Ege was a member of the Norwegian national handball team, which he represented over 250 times during his career.

External links
 player info

1972 births
Living people
Norwegian male handball players
Expatriate handball players